Chionodes helicosticta is a moth in the family Gelechiidae. It is found in North America, where it has been recorded from Texas, Arizona, California and Oregon.

The wingspan is 19–22 mm. The forewings are rather dark fuscous with a short black subcostal dash near the base, preceded and followed by whitish-brown scales or marks, sometimes a black dot beyond this. A shorter black pale-tipped dash is found on the fold somewhat beyond this. The discal stigmata are darker, laterally edged by ochreous-white scales, or sometimes reduced to pale ochreous dots, with the plical rather darker or sometimes blackish, preceded and followed by white scales, obliquely before the first discal. A faint spot of pale ochreous suffusion is found on the costa at two-thirds and there is a marginal series of small indistinct blackish dots around the posterior part of the costa and termen, sometimes accompanied by minute ochreous-white dots. The hindwings are light bluish-grey.

The larvae feed on Eriogonum nudum.

References

Chionodes
Moths described in 1929
Moths of North America